Warren Beatty: Mister Hollywood (French title: Warren Beatty, une obsession hollywoodienne) is a French-Dutch documentary film directed by Olivier Nicklaus. The world premiere took place on  October 4, 2015.

Plot
The center of attention — Hollywood actor, director, screenwriter, producer, first-class playboy and even a candidate for U.S. President Warren Beatty.

References

External links
 
Sonia Devillers. Warren Beatty, une obsession hollywoodienne, sur Arte dimanche à 22h45
 To beat, beat, Beatty

2015 television films
2015 films
Dutch documentary films
French documentary films
2010s French-language films
2010s English-language films
2010s French films